Bárbara Dichiara (born 13 November 1996) is an Argentinian field hockey player.

Hockey career 
Dichiara was part of the Argentina Junior National Team at the 2016 Junior World Cup where the team won the gold medal, defeating the Netherlands in the final.

In 2018, Dichiara took part of the team that won the 2018 South American Games.

References

Living people
1996 births
Argentine female field hockey players
South American Games gold medalists for Argentina
South American Games medalists in field hockey
Competitors at the 2018 South American Games
Sportspeople from Mendoza, Argentina
20th-century Argentine women
21st-century Argentine women